Lake Todd is a natural lake in South Dakota, in the United States.

Lake Todd has the name of the local Todd family which settled there.

See also
List of lakes in South Dakota

References

Lakes of South Dakota
Lakes of Clark County, South Dakota